Jaana Lyytikäinen (born 22 October 1982) is a Finnish footballer, currently playing for Åland United in Finland's Naisten Liiga. She has been a member of the senior Finland women's national football team since her debut against Scotland in September 2007.

National coach Andrée Jeglertz selected Lyytikäinen in Finland's squad for UEFA Women's Euro 2013, where she played in two of the Finns' three games.

References

1982 births
Living people
Finnish women's footballers
Finland women's international footballers
Kansallinen Liiga players
Helsingin Jalkapalloklubi (women) players
Åland United players
FC Honka (women) players
PK-35 Vantaa (women) players
Women's association football midfielders
Women's association football forwards
People from Kuopio
Sportspeople from North Savo